The Battle of Tara may refer to following battles:

Battle of Tara (Ireland), 980, at Hill of Tara, between Uí Néill and Kingdom of Dublin
Battle of Tara (1150), at Tara river, between Grand Principality of Serbia and Byzantine Empire
Battle of Tara Hill, between British forces and Irish rebels involved in the Irish Rebellion of 1798